The 1981 Baylor Bears football team represented Baylor University in the 1981 NCAA Division I-A football season. The Bears finished the season sixth in the Southwest Conference. In the Battle of the Brazos, the Bears beat Texas A&M for the fourth consecutive season. It was the longest winning streak the Bears had in the rivalry.

Schedule

Team players drafted into the NFL
The following players were drafted into professional football following the season.

References

Baylor
Baylor Bears football seasons
Baylor Bears football